Mian or miyan is a royal title of the Indian subcontinent, also sometimes used as a surname. Begum   or Beygum, is used to describe the wife of a Mian. It is used by several monarchs of Indian states.

In the Mughal Empire, mian indicated a king or a prince under the suzerainty of the Mughal emperor; it is hence roughly equivalent to the title of raja, but could also take the higher meaning of maharaja, in which sense it was used by the Kalhora dynasty of Sindh. It was also conferred by the Mughal emperor Jahangir upon Rajput rulers in the group of northern princely states known as the Indian Hill States. The title is mentioned by the British in The Golden Book of India as one of the principal titles used by "Mohammedan Princely States":"Other Mohammadan titles sometimes equivalent in consideration to Nawab, but not always are Wali, Sultan, Shah, Amir, Mir, Mirza, Mian, Khan ; also Sardar and Diwan, which are common to Hindus and Mohammadans".

Etymology 
Mian is said to literally mean "Prince". Although it may also be translated as "Lord" or "Master".

Compound Derivatives 
The Mughal Emperor Aurangzeb conferred the compound derivative of Sayyid Mian upon Abdullah Khan Barha. The compound title Miangul is used by all member of the erstwhile state Swat including the head of the house. . While in Sangri state the ruler is addressed as Rai Mian.

British Era 
The title was translated by the British as meaning "Prince", "Lord" or "Master". The title was often used by rulers of Jagirs as well as Princes of Blood of both Hindu Rajput States, as well as Muslim Princely States. The title held pre-eminence in Sindh where it was used by the dynasts of the former Royal dynasties of Kahlora dynasty and Soomro and held in that capacity by the former Soomro Prime Minister of Pakistan Muhammad Mian Soomro. The title was prominent in the Himalayan region as well as regions adjacent to it. The British noted in the Gurdaspur Imperial Gazetteer that the title Mian held the highest rank above Malik or Chaudhry within the Gurdaspur District of Punjab. The title was also often given to sons of Nawabs.

Princely States 
The title is used in varying capacity by members of princely states, sometimes used for Princes and other times used by the Monarch himself.

In Baoni the title is used by members of certain branches of the royal family. 
In Bhopal its used by members of certain branches. 
In Muhammadgarh State, the title of Mian is used by the Heir Apparent.
 In Pathari State the hier apparent is styled as Mian.
In Khajuria State the monarch is styled as Mian.
In Swat State. The title Miangul was used by all dynasts of the Swat state including the Wali of Swat himself. 
 In Guler State the monarch was formerly styled as Mian and later styled as Raja.
 In Punjab the sons and especially the heir apparent of rulers are styled as Mian as well as some rulers themselves.

Bombay Region 
The title held immense importance in the Bombay region, and was used by the monarchs of several Princely States in that area. Including:

In Dabha state the monarch is styled as Mian.
 In Dugri State the monarch is styled as Mian.
 In Jabria Bhil State the monarch is styled as Mian.
 In Kharal State the monarch is styled as Mian.
 In Punadra State the monarch is styled as Mian.
 In Ramas State the monarch is styled as Mian.

Himalayan Region 
Ever since the bestowal of the title of Mian upon the Royal Households of the Himalayas by the Emperor Jahangir, the title has held great importance in the Himalayan region.

 In Sangri State the monarch is styled as Mian.
 In Kashmir State the title is held by grandsons of the Maharaja of Kashmir.
 In Nadaun, the title is reserved for the hier apparent of the state.
 In Lambagraon, dynasts are styled as Mian.
 In Jaswan, the monarch is styled as Mian.
 In Rai State the monarch is styled as Mian.
 In Pirthpura State the monarch is styled as Mian.

In the foothills of the Himalayas. Dynast's of the Rohilla Dynasty which ruled the erstwhile Kingdom of Rohilkhand and later the Princely State of Rampur are styled informally as Mian. The style of address is extended to all dynasts including the Nawab of Rampur himself.

Notable people

America
Atif Mian, economist
Mian Hussain, boxer
Zia Mian, physicist, nuclear expert, nuclear policy maker and research scientist

Bangladesh
 Abu Taher Miah (1932–2004), Bangladeshi industrialist and politician 
 Badsha Miah, kabaddi player
 Bande Ali Mia (1906–1979), Bangladeshi poet
 M. A. Wazed Miah (1942–2009), Bangladeshi nuclear scientist
 Mohammad Mamun Miah (born 1987), footballer
 Mohammad Moniruzzaman Miah (c.1935–2016), academic
 Muhammad Shahjahan Miah, politician
 Rana Miah, cricketer
 Sheikh Sujat Mia, former MP for Habiganj-1
 Tofazzal Hossain Manik Miah (1911–1969), journalist and politician

Europe
 Abjol Miah, former councillor of Shadwell
 Andrew Muzaffar Miah, bioethicist and journalist
 Badrul Miah, convicted of a racially motivated murder
 Emran Mian, author
 Hammad Miah (born 1993), professional snooker player
 Helal Miah, investment analyst at The Share Centre
 Moina Meah, restaurateur and social reformer
 Safwan AhmedMia, technology reviewer and Internet personality
 Saiman Miah (born 1986), architectural designer and graphic designer
 Tamanna Miah, activist
 Mohammad Ajman Tommy Miah MBE, celebrity chef

India
 Ameen Mian Qaudri, Sufi custodian
 Azhari Miyan, Barelvi leader
 Fazal Karim Miah, Indian politician
 Ghazi Miyan, legendary figure
 Habib Miyan, longevity claimant
 Hashmi Miya, Muslim theologian
 Madni Miyan, Sufi leader
 Mian Bashir Ahmed, Sufi leader
 Miya people, a Muslim community in Assam
 Mian Rajputs, landowning clan 
 Syed Mian, Mughal commander

British India
 Batak Mian, cook
 Dudu Miyan (1819-1862), independence leader
 Jitu Miah (d. 1925), magistrate and sub-registrar
 Kaptan Miah (1872-1922), politician, lawyer and entrepreneur
 Mian Aminuddin, civil servant

Nepal
 Hasina Miya, Nepalese politician
 Sadrul Miya Haque, Nepalese politician
 Salim Miya Ansari, Nepalese politician

Pakistan
 Ajmal Mian, Chief Justice of the Supreme Court
 Mian Amer Mahmood, businessperson
 Mian family of Baghbanpura, a noble Arain family of Lahore
 Mian (tribe), a Pakistani Punjabi tribe in the Ishaqpura region
 Mian Mir, Sufi saint
 Mian Muhammad Bakhsh, Sufi saint and poet
 Mian Muhammad Mansha, billionaire and business magnate
 Mian Muhammad Latif, businessman
 Mian Muhammad Sharif, businessman
 Mian Tufail Mohammad, theologian
 Mian Hayaud Din, major general
 Mian Iftikharuddin, leftist leader
 Mian Saqib Nisar, jurist
 Mian Nawaz Sharif, former prime minister of Pakistan
 Mian Shahbaz Sharif, chief minister of Punjab
 Mian Wada, Pothwari saint
 Mian Yar Muhammad Kalhoro, philanthropist
 Muhammad Mian Soomro, banker and former Chairman of the Senate
 Salahuddin Mian, Pakistan's first ceramic artist
 Mian Muhammad Yousaf Riaz, renowned baraf-pani athlete

Uganda
 Farouk Miya (born 1997), footballer

Places
 Mian, a village in Mansa district, Indian Punjab
 Mian Channu, a city in Khanewal District, Pakistani Punjab
 Mian Channu Tehsil, an administrative subdivision of Khanewal District, Pakistani Punjab
 Mian Wali Qureshian, a town in Rahim Yar Khan District, Pakistani Punjab
 Mianwali, a city in Punjab, Pakistan
 Mian Deh, Badakhshan, Afghanistan
 Mian Sahib and Bab-e-Mian Sahib, Sindh
 Miyan Velayat District, Iran
 Miyan Velayat Rural District, Iran
 Bhaini Mian Khan, India
 Kateh Mian, Iran
 Mian Qaleh, Chaharmahal and Bakhtiari, Iran
 Mian Qaleh, Fars, Iran
 Mian Qaleh, Ilam, Iran
 Safal Mian, Iran
 Mian Bal, Iran
 Mian Talan, Iran
 Mian Tang, Iran
 Mian Qaleh, Kermanshah, Iran 
 Taherabad-e Mian, Iran
Mian Choqa, Kermanshah, Iran
Mian Choqa, Lorestan, Iran
Mian Chilan, Iran
Mian Melk, Iran
Mian Nahr, Iran
Mian Bazur, Iran
Mian Rah, Iran
Mian Farirud, Iran
Mian Margh, Iran

See also
Bade Miyan Chote Miyan, 1998 Indian film
Chhote Miyan, Indian comedy
Tanju Miah, 2006 British documentary

References

Titles in Bangladesh
Indian surnames
Pakistani names
Punjabi-language surnames
Gujarati-language surnames
Bengali Muslim surnames
Titles in India